Haltham Wood is a woodland in the parish of Haltham in the East Lindsey district of Lincolnshire, England.

References

Forests and woodlands of Lincolnshire
Geography of Lincolnshire
Tourist attractions in Lincolnshire